A dignitary tort is type of intentional tort where the cause of action is being subjected to certain kinds of indignities. Historically, this category of torts was often covered by the writ of trespass vi et armis.

Historically, the primary dignitary torts were battery, assault, and false imprisonment, as each claimed harm to a person's human dignity. A cause of action could be brought for battery, for example, even if no injury was done to the plaintiff, so long as the contact would be offensive to a reasonable person. Under modern jurisprudence the category of dignitary torts is more closely associated with secondary dignitary torts, most notably defamation (slander and libel), false light, intentional infliction of emotional distress, invasion of privacy, and alienation of affections. In some jurisdictions, the phrase is limited to those torts which do not require physical injury or threat of physical injury, limiting the class to only those secondary incidents.

The only non-intentional act classified as a dignitary tort is negligent infliction of emotional distress, although this is also sometimes classified as simply another form of negligence.

References

Footnotes

Bibliography

 

Tort law